Douglas Jones may refer to:

 Douglas Jones (footballer) (1914–1997), Welsh footballer
 Douglas C. Jones (1924–1998), American author of historical fiction
 Douglas L. Jones, American professor in electrical and computer engineering at the University of Illinois
 Douglas Jones (mathematician) (1922–2013), British mathematician
 Douglas Jones, former editor of Credenda/Agenda
 Douglas W. Jones (born c. 1950), American computer scientist and electronic voting expert

See also
 Doug Jones (disambiguation)
 List of people with surname Jones